Orizaj may refer to:
Orizaj, Berat, a village in the municipality of Berat, Berat County, Albania
Orizaj, Skrapar, a village in the municipality of Skrapar, Berat County, Albania